Robert Wardell (1793 – 7 September 1834) was an English-born Australian barrister and newspaper editor.

Early life
Wardell was born in England and educated at Trinity College, Cambridge, where he matriculated 1810, gained his LL.B. in 1817 and a LL.D. in 1823. Wardell was editor and proprietor of the Statesman, a London evening paper, when in 1819 he met William Wentworth. In 1821, Wardell was one of a number of newspaper editors in London accused of “the publication of seditious libels.”

In 1823, Wardell applied for the new position of attorney-general in New South Wales but was unsuccessful; the position went instead to Saxe Bannister.

Australia
In 1824 Wardell sold his Statesman paper and formed a partnership with Wentworth. Printing materials were purchased as part of a plan to found an Australian newspaper, and they sailed for Australia, arriving about September. Soon afterwards they started The Australian, the first number appearing on 14 October 1824 and was to be published weekly at a cost of one shilling. It was the first independent paper to be published in Australia, and Governor Thomas Brisbane who was approaching the end of his term was inclined to welcome it. After the arrival of Governor Ralph Darling in December 1825, friction between the governor and the paper developed. Early in 1827 governor Darling was devising means to control its criticism of his actions; he brought in a newspaper tax of fourpence a copy, but chief justice Francis Forbes refused to sanction the act. In September 1827 Wardell who had referred to the governor in The Australian as "an ignorant and obstinate man" was charged with libel. Wardell conducted his own defence with great ability and the jury failed to agree. Wardell was again on trial for libel in December, and Wentworth who was defending him asserted that the jurors, who were members of the military, might lose their commissions if they did not return a verdict for Darling. The jury again disagreed.

He fought a duel, in late 1826, with the then former Attorney-General, Saxe Bannister. An item in the Australian titled, 'How-e to live by plunder''' , resulted in a second duel, in 1827, this time with Governor Darling's brother-in-law and private secretary, Lieutenant Colonel Henry Dumaresq; nobody was injured in either duel,

Wardell was now editor and sole proprietor of The Australian and his practice as a barrister was increasing; early in 1831 the government was glad to brief him in an action for damages against it. Towards the end of 1831 Governor Darling was informed by Frederick John Robinson, 1st Viscount Goderich that his six-year term as governor would soon be expiring, and after the arrival of the liberal-minded Governor Richard Bourke, Wardell's writing became much more temperate in tone. In 1834, having made a moderate fortune, he was intending to go to England, but on 7 September 1834 when inspecting his estate on horseback at Petersham, New South Wales he came across three runaway convicts and tried to persuade them to give themselves up. The leader of the men, John Jenkins, however, picked up a gun and fatally shot Wardell. The men were arrested a few days later and two of them were subsequently hanged. Wardell was unmarried.

Wardell Road, which runs south from Petersham, in Sydney, is named after him.

References

Additional resources listed by the Dictionary of Australian Biography:
Aubrey Halloran, Journal and Proceedings Royal Australian Historical Society, vol. X, pp. 337–47; The Sydney Herald, 11 and 15 September 1834; G. B. Barton, Literature in New South Wales, pp. 20–4; R. Therry, Reminiscences of Thirty Years' Residence in New South Wales and Victoria, 2nd ed. pp. 349–52.

Additional resources listed by the Australian Dictionary of Biography:
 Historical Records of Australia'', Series I, vols 11-17
 newspaper indices under Wardell (State Library of New South Wales)
 W. C. Wentworth, legal letterbook (State Library of New South Wales)
 family bible (1660) annotated by T. D. Mutch (State Library of New South Wales)
 Supreme Court records (State Records New South Wales)
 CO 201/147/540.

External links
 

1793 births
1834 deaths
Australian barristers
Australian people of English descent
19th-century Australian newspaper publishers (people)
19th-century British newspaper publishers (people)
Australian mass media owners
Alumni of Trinity College, Cambridge
Australian newspaper editors
Australian newspaper proprietors
Australian murder victims
19th-century Australian journalists
19th-century Australian male writers
Australian duellists
Australian male journalists